Glenea numerifera is a species of beetle in the family Cerambycidae. It was described by James Thomson in 1865. It is known from Malaysia, Borneo and Sumatra.

References

numerifera
Beetles described in 1865